{{Infobox writer 
| name = John Brandon
| image = 
| caption = 
| birth_date = 
| birth_place = Bradenton, Florida
| death_date =
| death_place =
| occupation = 
| alma_mater = University of Florida, Washington University in St. Louis
| period =
| genre = Southern Gothic, cult fiction
| subject =
| movement =
| website = 
| imagesize = 200px
| notableworks ="A Million Heavens," "Citrus Country," "Arkansas," "Further Joy"
}}

John Brandon is an American novelist and teacher. A young cult fiction author, heavily influenced by Flannery O'Connor.

Biography
Brandon was born in Bradenton, Florida, attended elementary school in Elfers, and attended Bayonet Middle School and River Ridge High School in New Port Richey. He later attended the University of Florida, where he received a degree in English, and Brandon also received a Master's degree in fiction writing from Washington University in St. Louis. After writing Arkansas Brandon gained the attention of Barry Hannah, who nominated him for the John and Renee Grisham Writer-in-Residence program at the University of Mississippi. He then went on to work a series of warehouse and factory jobs before holding a one-year fellowship at the Gilman School and teaching at Hamline University in Minnesota. He was also the GQ's SEC College Football analyst. He is a self-proclaimed worshiper of Joy Williams.

Awards and nominations
Young Lions Fiction Award (2011, nominated for Citrus County)
Alex Awards (2011, nominated for Citrus County) 

BibliographyArkansas (McSweeney's, 2009)Citrus County (McSweeney's, 2010)A Million Heavens (McSweeney's, 2012)Further Joy (McSweeney's, 2014)Ivory Shoals'' (McSweeney's, 2021)

References

Living people
21st-century American male writers
21st-century American novelists
American male novelists
Hamline University faculty
Novelists from Florida
People from Bradenton, Florida
University of Florida alumni
Washington University in St. Louis alumni
Year of birth missing (living people)